Kathleen McDermott (born 21 May 1977) is a Scottish actress, singer, model, and make-up artist. She is best known for her roles in the feature film Morvern Callar (2002), the television film Wedding Belles (2007), and the miniseries Dead Set (2008).

Biography
McDermott is an experienced vocalist, who also enjoys martial arts and snowboarding.  She was working as a hairdresser when spotted by the casting director for Morvern Callar.  She is best known for her appearance as Shaz in Wedding Belles and Pippa in E4's 2008 series Dead Set. In 2009, she played Debbi in the Scottish sitcom Happy Hollidays.

She appeared in the music video "Books from Boxes" by Maxïmo Park.

Filmography
2002: Morvern Callar as Lanna
2002: Taggart (Series 19): "Blood Money" as Caroline Taylor
2003: Out of the Cold as a school teacher
2004: Baldy McBain as Teacher
2004: Squaddie as Michelle
2005: Milk as Jennifer
2006: Nina's Heavenly Delights as Janice Shah
2007: Wedding Belles as Shaz
2007: Casualty: "Seize The Day" as Lowri Dart
2008: Dead Set as Pippa
2008: Rab C. Nesbitt: "Christmas Special" as Lorna Nesbitt
2009: Casualty: "Before A Fall" as Tanya
2009: Happy Hollidays as Debbi
2012: New Tricks as Charley
2015: The Syndicate as Journalist, Three Episodes

References

External links
 

1977 births
Living people
Scottish film actresses
Scottish television actresses
21st-century Scottish women singers
Scottish pop singers
Scottish rock singers
Scottish female models
Scottish make-up artists
21st-century Scottish actresses
Actresses from Glasgow
BAFTA winners (people)